Zurvan is the primordial creator deity in Zurvanism, a now-extinct branch of the Zoroastrianism religion.

Zurvan may also refer to:
Time in Avestan Middle Persian
Zurvan (زروان), a village in Larestan County, Fars, Iran.

In popular culture:
 Zarvan (زَروان), the personification of time in Shahnameh
 Zurvan, an alien intelligence in the Palladium Books RPG games that sometimes creates gods as an experiment
 Zurvan, the primary antagonist of Prince of Persia: The Two Thrones
 Zur-van, a superhero in Grant Morrison's The Filth (comics)
 Zurvan, the name of one of the Four Gods of Runepunk in Savage Worlds
 Zurvan, a minor antagonist in StarCraft II: Heart of the Swarm
 Zurvan, the name of one of the Amp Stations in Planetside 2

See also
 Aion (deity) (Αἰών)
 Chronos (Χρόνος, "time")  
 Father Time
 Janus